Arviat was a territorial electoral district (riding) for the Legislative Assembly of Nunavut, Canada. The riding consisted of the community of Arviat.

In 2011 the Nunavut Electoral Boundaries Commission recommended the district be split into two districts, Arviat North-Whale Cove and Arviat South. With the passage of Bill 22 in October 2011 the two new districts were created.

Election results

1999 election

2004 election

2008 election

References

External links
Website of the Legislative Assembly of Nunavut

Electoral districts of Kivalliq Region
1999 establishments in Nunavut
2013 disestablishments in Nunavut